Latrodectus karrooensis is a species of spider in the family Theridiidae, found in South Africa. It is one of six species of Latrodectus found in southern Africa, four of which, including L. karrooensis, are known as black button or black widow spiders. Like all Latrodectus species, L. karrooensis has a neurotoxic venom. It acts on nerve endings, causing the very unpleasant symptoms of latrodectism when humans are bitten.

References

Endemic fauna of South Africa
karrooensis
Spiders of South Africa
Spiders described in 1944